Bait al-Maqdis, Bayt al-Maqdis, or Bayt al-Muqaddas is an Arabic name and a common designation for Jerusalem in the Arabic language.

Organizations
 Ansar Bait al-Maqdis, the jihadist militant group based in Egypt.
 Aknaf Bait al-Maqdis, the Palestinian rebel group active during the Syrian Civil War.

See also
Al-Quds (disambiguation)